Anna Viktorovna Mongait (née Loshak) is a Russian journalist, television presenter, and creative producer of the Dozhd TV channel.

Early life
Mongait was born in 1978 in Odesa, Ukrainian Soviet Socialist Republic. She studied journalism at the Lomonosov Moscow State University and Russian New University.

Career
Mongait worked as an editor at the Channel One Russia, Russia-1, and Russia-K.

From 2001 to 2004, she was a news correspondent for NTV.

From 2005 to 2010, she hosted the "" program on Russia-K.

Since 2010, she has regularly published articles on contemporary artists in Tatler. The same year, she started working as a TV host on Dozhd. Since 2015, he has hosted the regular programs “Here and now” and “Women on top” on the same TV channel.

In 2021, Mongait received death threats from the far-right "Male State" group after she interviewed a same-sex couple for the “Women on top” program. 

Due to the Russian invasion of Ukraine, the Russian government blocked Dozhd in March 2022. Consequently, Mongait had to leave the country. As of December 2022, she lived in Riga and continued working on Dozhd which resumed its operation in July the same year.

In November 2022, the Russian Ministry of Justice included Mongait in the list of foreign agents.

Personal life
Mongait is of Jewish origin. Her father, is a journalist. He worked as the former chief editor of the Ogoniok journal. Her mother, is the director of the Pushkin State Museum of Fine Arts in Moscow.

Anna Mongait is married to Sergei Mongait, who works as a creative director at a design studio. They have two sons.

References

1978 births
Living people
TV Rain
Russian journalists
Russian women journalists
Russian activists against the 2022 Russian invasion of Ukraine
People listed in Russia as foreign agents